India competed at the 1984 Summer Paralympics in Stoke Mandeville, Great Britain and New York City, United States. 5 competitors from India won 4 medals including 2 silver and 2 bronze and finished joint 37th in the medal table with South Korea.

Medalists

See also 
 India at the Paralympics
 India at the 1984 Summer Olympics

References 

India at the Paralympics
1984 in Indian sport
Nations at the 1984 Summer Paralympics